Palamuse was a rural municipality of Estonia, in Jõgeva County. It had a population of 2,509 (2006) and an area of 216 km².

Populated places
Palamuse Parish had one small borough, Palamuse, and 25 villages: Änkküla, Eerikvere, Ehavere, Imukvere, Järvepera, Kaarepere, Kaiavere, Kassivere, Kivimäe, Kudina, Luua, Mullavere, Nava, Pikkjärve, Praaklima, Raadivere, Rahivere, Ronivere, Sudiste, Süvalepa, Toovere, Vaidavere, Vanavälja, Varbevere, Visusti.

References

External links